The Rev. John Archibald Dunbar-Dunbar (8 October 1849 – 11 November 1905) was a British philatelist who was one of the "Fathers of Philately" entered on the Roll of Distinguished Philatelists in 1921. He was an expert in the stamps of Australia.

Early life
Dunbar-Dunbar was born on 8 October 1849 at Seapark, Forres, Morayshire, Scotland, the son of Edward Dunbar-Dunbar, a Captain in the 21st Fusiliers, and Phoebe Dunbar (died 1899 leaving £109,808). He received his university education at Oxford, graduating with a B.A. degree in 1873.

Clerical career
On 5 November 1875 at Warwick he married Louisa Cambray and by 1875 he was Assistant Curate at St. Salvador's Church, Dundee where he was subsequently ordained as a priest in 1876. In April 1878 he became the curate at St. Margaret's Episcopal Church, Lochee, Dundee.

Death
The Reverend died in 1905 and left estate valued at £151,192. His stamps were left to the Museum of Science and Art in Edinburgh. He also left a bequest to benefit 10 poor persons in the Findhorn area aged 65 and upwards, which must have been sizeable at the time, but is now only about £4000. Dunbar-Dunbar was survived by his wife Louisa who did not die until the 1930s.

References

External links
J.A. Dunbar-Dunbar at thepeerage.com
The history of the Rev John Archibald Dunbar Dunbar Bequest.

Dunbar-Dunbar, J. A.
Dunbar-Dunbar, J. A.
Dunbar-Dunbar, J. A.
Alumni of the University of Oxford
Philately of Australia
Fathers of philately
People associated with Dundee
Scottish Episcopalian clergy